Morris J. Amitay (July 5, 1936 – February 10, 2023) was an American lobbyist who was the executive director of the American Israel Public Affairs Committee (AIPAC) (1974–1980),  vice chairman of the Jewish Institute for National Security Affairs (JINSA), and the founder and treasurer of the Washington Political Action Committee.

Early life and education
Amitay was born in New York City on July 5, 1936.

Amitay earned his undergraduate degree from Columbia University, his J.D. degree from Harvard Law School (where he wrote his thesis for Henry Kissinger's Defense Policy Seminar) and a Master's degree in Public Administration from Harvard University.

Career
Amitay was a Foreign Service Officer from 1962 to 1969, with assignments in Italy, South Africa and the State Department.

In 1981, he founded the Washington Political Action Committee, which through 2018 had contributed almost four million dollars to Israel's supporters in the U.S. Congress.

Before taking over AIPAC, Amitay worked in the U.S. House of Representatives and for five years as a legislative aide in the U.S. Senate, where he "took a lead role in organizing congressional initiatives affecting Israel and Soviet Jewry".

Amitay became AIPAC president in 1974, succeeding Isaiah L. Kenen and leading for six years. Amitay transformed AIPAC, making it more aggressive and confrontational. He computerized the AIPAC offices, moved it to Capitol Hill, swelled the office staff from a handful to dozens, and increased the annual budget from $400,000 to $1.2 million. The list of key contacts held by Kenan expanded from hundreds to eleven thousand. Membership increased to over 55 thousand.

Amitay appeared as a commentator on a number of national radio and television programs including CNN, National Public Radio, the Lehrer Report, the Voice of America, Fox News and the BBC.

Personal life and death
On July 25, 1977, Amitay's home was the target of a bomb that killed the family dog but caused no other injuries.

Amitay resided in Maryland. He died on February 10, 2023, at the age of 86.

See also
 Lobbying in the United States
 List of AIPAC officers

References

External links
 Morris J. Amitay, P.C.
 Washington PAC website
 Washington PAC at OpenSecrets

1936 births
2023 deaths
American lobbyists
20th-century American Jews
Columbia College (New York) alumni
Harvard Law School alumni
Zionism in the United States
American Zionists
Activists from New York City
Harvard Kennedy School alumni
American expatriates in Italy
American expatriates in South Africa
American Israel Public Affairs Committee
21st-century American Jews